John Christian Cossù Sánchez (born 5 June 1992) is a Uruguayan footballer plays as a midfielder for Murciélagos F.C.

References

External links
 
 

1992 births
Living people
Uruguayan footballers
Uruguayan expatriate footballers
Association football midfielders
Uruguayan Primera División players
C.A. Cerro players
Montevideo City Torque players